During the 2006–07 German football season, Borussia Dortmund competed in the Bundesliga.

Season summary
Dortmund finished the season in 9th place, their worst finish in 7 years.

Players

First-team squad
Squad at end of season

Left club during season

Borussia Dortmund II
The following players were assigned a number for the first team, but did not make an appearance this season.

Statistics

Appearances and goals
As of end of season

|-
! colspan=14 style=background:#dcdcdc; text-align:center| Goalkeepers

|-
! colspan=14 style=background:#dcdcdc; text-align:center| Defenders

|-
! colspan=14 style=background:#dcdcdc; text-align:center| Midfielders

|-
! colspan=14 style=background:#dcdcdc; text-align:center| Forwards

|-
! colspan=14 style=background:#dcdcdc; text-align:center| Players transferred out during the season

Transfers

In
 Nelson Valdez - Werder Bremen, July, €4,700,000

Out
 Tomáš Rosický - Arsenal, 23 May, undisclosed
 Delron Buckley - FC Basel, season-long loan
 David Odonkor - Real Betis, €6,000,000

Competitions

Bundesliga

League table

Matches
 Bayern Munich 2-0 Borussia Dortmund
 Borussia Dortmund 3-2 Bayern Munich
 Schalke 04 3-1 Borussia Dortmund
 VfL Wolfsburg 0-2 Borussia Dortmund

References

Notes

Borussia Dortmund seasons
Borussia Dortmund